Nihad Đedović (born January 12, 1990) is a Bosnian professional basketball player for Unicaja of the Liga ACB. He also represented the Bosnia and Herzegovina national basketball team internationally.

Professional career
Đedović started his career with KK Bosna, but FC Barcelona signed him when he was just 16 years old. He never got a real chance to play in Barcelona, and spent most of the time on loans in Cornellà, Obradoiro and with Virtus Roma. After leaving Barcelona, he played for Galatasaray and Alba Berlin.

In July 2013 he signed for Bayern Munich. In July 2014, it was announced that he signed a two-year extension with the team. On July 11, 2016, Đedović agreed on a contract extension with Bayern until 2018, including a team option for the 2018–19 season.

On June 22, 2022, he signed with Unicaja of the Liga ACB.

Bosnian national team
He was one of the key players of Bosnia and Herzegovina national team. On EuroBasket 2011 he averaged 10.6 points, 5.2 rebounds and 4.2 assists per game, while on EuroBasket 2013 he averaged 17.8 points, 5.2 rebounds and 4.2 assists per game.

Career statistics

EuroLeague

|-
| style="text-align:left;"| 2007–08
| style="text-align:left;" rowspan=2| Barcelona
| 1 || 0 || 5.8 || .000 || .000 || .500 || 2.0 || .0 || .0 || .0 || 1.0 || 3.0
|-
| style="text-align:left;"| 2008–09
| 3 || 0 || 3.3 || .000 || .000 || .000 || .3 || .0 || .0 || .0 || .0 || -1.0
|-
| style="text-align:left;"| 2010–11
| style="text-align:left;"| Lottomatica
| 15 || 15 || 27.3 || .426 || .194 || .742 || 3.1 || 2.1 || 1.7 || .3 || 9.3 || 8.9
|-
| style="text-align:left;"| 2012–13
| style="text-align:left;"| Alba Berlin
| 23 || 13 || 23.5 || .411 || .265 || .695 || 3.3 || 2.5 || 1.0 || .0 || 8.6 || 7.6
|-
| style="text-align:left;"| 2013–14
| style="text-align:left;" rowspan=4| Bayern
| 18 || 16 || 25.5 || .458 || .400 || .921 || 3.6 || 2.3 || .8 || .1 || 11.7 || 10.4
|-
| style="text-align:left;"| 2014–15
| 10 || 7 || 25.5 || .439 || .375 || .818 || 2.8 || 2.4 || .5 || .2 || 11.6 || 10.5
|-
| style="text-align:left;"| 2015–16
| 10 || 8 || 26.6 || .469 || .333 || .857 || 3.0 || 2.6 || 1.2 || .0 || 12.4 || 12.0
|-
| style="text-align:left;"| 2018–19
| 30 || 28 || 23.0 || .463 || .333 || .836 || 2.5 || 2.7 || 1.0 || .0 || 9.9 || 10.0
|- class="sortbottom"
| colspan=2 align=center | Career
| 110 || 87 || 24.0 || .443 || .319 || .799 || 2.9 || 2.4 || 1.0 || .1 || 9.9 || 9.2

Personal life
He is the older brother of Nedim Đedović. He has also held German citizenship since April 2015.

References

External link

 
 Nihad Đedović at draftexpress.com
 Nihad Đedović at eurobasket.com
 Nihad Đedović at euroleague.net
 
 

1990 births
Living people
Alba Berlin players
Bosnia and Herzegovina expatriate basketball people in Germany
Bosnia and Herzegovina expatriate basketball people in Spain
Bosnia and Herzegovina men's basketball players
Bosniaks of Bosnia and Herzegovina
FC Barcelona Bàsquet players
FC Bayern Munich basketball players
Galatasaray S.K. (men's basketball) players
Liga ACB players
Obradoiro CAB players
Pallacanestro Virtus Roma players
People from Višegrad
Shooting guards
Small forwards